Elections to Derry City Council were held on 7 June 2001 on the same day as the other Northern Irish local government elections. The election used five district electoral areas to elect a total of 30 councillors.

Election results

Note: "Votes" are the first preference votes.

Districts summary

|- class="unsortable" align="centre"
!rowspan=2 align="left"|Ward
! % 
!Cllrs
! % 
!Cllrs
! %
!Cllrs
! %
!Cllrs
! % 
!Cllrs
!rowspan=2|TotalCllrs
|- class="unsortable" align="center"
!colspan=2 bgcolor="" | SDLP
!colspan=2 bgcolor="" | Sinn Féin
!colspan=2 bgcolor="" | DUP
!colspan=2 bgcolor="" | UUP
!colspan=2 bgcolor="white"| Others
|-
|align="left"|Cityside
|45.5
|2
|bgcolor="#008800"|51.1
|bgcolor="#008800"|3
|0.0
|0
|0.0
|0
|3.4
|0
|5
|-
|align="left"|Northland
|bgcolor="#99FF66"|54.0
|bgcolor="#99FF66"|4
|39.0
|3
|0.0
|0
|0.0
|0
|7.0
|0
|7
|-
|align="left"|Rural
|bgcolor="#99FF66"|40.9
|bgcolor="#99FF66"|3
|16.5
|1
|24.3
|1
|16.6
|0
|1.7
|0
|6
|-
|align="left"|Shantallow
|bgcolor="#99FF66"|56.1
|bgcolor="#99FF66"|3
|38.6
|2
|0.0
|0
|0.0
|0
|5.3
|0
|5
|-
|align="left"|Waterside
|20.7
|2
|12.7
|1
|bgcolor="#D46A4C"|43.3
|bgcolor="#D46A4C"|3
|13.9
|1
|9.4
|0
|7
|-
|- class="unsortable" class="sortbottom" style="background:#C9C9C9"
|align="left"| Total
|43.4
|14
|30.3
|10
|14.3
|4
|6.4
|2
|5.6
|0
|30
|-
|}

District results

Cityside

1997: 3 x Sinn Féin, 2 x SDLP
2001: 3 x Sinn Féin, 2 x SDLP
1997-2001 Change: No change

Northland

1997: 5 x SDLP, 2 x Sinn Féin
2001: 4 x SDLP, 3 x Sinn Féin
1997-2001 Change: Sinn Féin gain from SDLP

Rural

1997: 3 x SDLP, 2 x UUP, 1 x DUP
2001: 3 x SDLP, 1 x UUP, 1 x DUP, 1 x Sinn Féin
1997-2001 Change: Sinn Féin gain from UUP

Shantallow

1997: 3 x SDLP, 2 x Sinn Féin
2001: 3 x SDLP, 2 x Sinn Féin
1997-2001 Change: No change

Waterside

1997: 3 x DUP, 1 x SDLP, 1 x UUP, 1 x Sinn Féin, 1 x Independent Unionist
2001: 3 x DUP, 2 x SDLP, 1 x UUP, 1 x Sinn Féin
1997-2001 Change: SDLP gain from Independent Unionist

References

Derry City Council elections
Derry